Events in the year 1789 in Norway.

Incumbents
Monarch: Christian VII

Events
July – The flood Storofsen struck eastern Norway.
9 July – Theater War part of the Russo-Swedish War (1788–1790): Denmark-Norway agreed to cease active engagement in the conflict. A statement of neutrality was issued by Denmark-Norway, not a formal peace treaty and Denmark-Norway leaves the war.
17 July: 
The town of Hammerfest was founded.
The town of Vardø was founded.
12 November – The Norwegian army retreated from Bohuslen back to Norway. During the retreat, the Norwegian army lost 1,500-3,000 men to hunger, disease, poor sanitary conditions, and exposure to continual autumn rainfall

Arts and literature

Births
29 January - Fredrik Riis, civil servant (d.1845)
 19 March  Peter Christian Knudtzon, businessman (died 1864)
2 November - Karen Wedel-Jarlsberg, courtier (d.1849)

Full date unknown
Ole Johannesen Staff, politician

Deaths
1 August - Peder Hjort, businessperson (born 1715)

Full date unknown
Eric Gustaf Tunmarck, painter (born 1729).

See also

References